Campbell Park is a district and central park in Milton Keynes, Buckinghamshire, England.

Campbell Park may also refer to:
 Campbell Park Cricket Ground in the above park
 Campbell Park (civil parish) is a civil parish in the Borough of Milton Keynes (despite its name, it does not contain the park district)
Campbell Park, Canberra, which together with Russell Offices, is the Headquarters of the Australian Defence Force
 Campbell Falls State Park Reserve, in the United States is sometimes abbreviated to "Campbell Park"